The Netherlands Football League Championship 1951–1952 was contested by 56 teams participating in four divisions. The national champion would be determined by a play-off featuring the winners of each division of the Netherlands. Willem II won this year's championship by beating Hermes DVS, HFC Haarlem and AFC Ajax.

New entrants
This season, there was one division less than in the last one. This meant that the team had to be reassigned.
Eerste Klasse A:
Moving in from other Divisions: AGOVV Apeldoorn, DWV, HFC EDO, Enschedese Boys, HVV 't Gooi, HFC Haarlem, De Volewijckers
Promoted from 2nd Division: Elinkwijk & Theole
Eerste Klasse B:
Moving in from other Divisions: Achilles, Be Quick 1887, Blauw-Wit Amsterdam, VV Leeuwarden, RCH, Sneek Wit Zwart, VSV and Zwolsche Boys
Promoted from 2nd Division: Oosterparkers
Eerste Klasse C:
Moving in from other Divisions: Bleijerheide, BVV Den Bosch, Feijenoord, FC Eindhoven, MVV Maastricht, NAC, RBC Roosendaal, Sittardia and Willem II
Promoted from 2nd Division: DHC Delft, Juliana & Quick Nijmegen
Eerste Klasse D:
Moving in from other Divisions: Brabantia, VV Chèvremont, Hermes DVS, HBS Craeyenhout, SV Limburgia, Maurits, NEC Nijmegen, PSV Eindhoven and VVV Venlo

Divisions

Eerste Klasse A

Eerste Klasse B

Achilles 1894 beat Oosterparkers in the play-off to avoid relegation.

Eerste Klasse C

Eerste Klasse D

Hermes DVS beat Sparta Rotterdam in the play-off to qualify for the Championship play-off.

Championship play-off

References
RSSSF Netherlands Football League Championships 1898-1954

Netherlands Football League Championship seasons
1951–52 in Dutch football
Neth